Hyde Memorial Observatory  is a community astronomical observatory located in Lincoln, Nebraska (USA) surrounded Holmes lake.  It is run totally by volunteers, furnished through public donations, and devoted purely to public viewing. It is named after a donation given by Flora Hyde in honor of her late husband Leicester, and opened in 1977.

See also 
List of astronomical observatories

References

External links
Lincoln Clear Sky Clock Forecasts of observing conditions covering Hyde Memorial Observatory.

Astronomical observatories in Nebraska
Buildings and structures in Lincoln, Nebraska
Education in Lincoln, Nebraska
Tourist attractions in Lincoln, Nebraska